Michael Robinson (1948–2010) was a Canadian artist, glassblower, and poet who investigated Indigenous, spiritual, and environmental themes.

Biography 
Michael Robinson was born in Toronto, Ontario, on 27 March 1948. Trained at Sheridan College's School of Design (Glass Major, 1969–1971), Robinson was an artist, glassblower, printmaker, and writer. He exhibited widely throughout Ontario, but also nationally (British Columbia, Alberta, Quebec, Newfoundland) and internationally (United States, Switzerland, Germany), and he received several national and provincial awards, as well as grants. Robinson died on 28 July 2010 in Peterborough Ontario.

Permanent collections
Robinson's work resides in the permanent collections of the following institutions:
 Canadian Museum of History
 Royal Ontario Museum 
 McMichael Gallery
 Thunder Bay Art Gallery
 Glenbow Art Institute in Calgary 
 Canada Council Art Bank
 Aboriginal Affairs and Northern Development Canada Aboriginal Art Collection, Government of Canada 
 Art Gallery of Perterborough

Published works 
 Freedom of Silence, 1988, 
 The Earth and the Dancing Man, 1991, 
 Touching the Serpent's Tail, 1992, 
 A Bird Within A Ring of Fire, 1998,

References

1948 births
2010 deaths
20th-century Canadian poets
Artists from Toronto
Canadian male poets
Canadian printmakers
Writers from Toronto
20th-century Canadian male writers
Canadian glass artists